Go-Go & Gumbo, Satchmo N Soul is a studio album recorded by the supergroup A la Carte Brass & Percussion featuring go-go musician Chuck Brown and blue-eyed soul singer Shaun Murphy. The album was recorded between October 1996 to February 1997, and released on October 21, 1997 by Mapleshade Records.

Track listing

Credits
Adapted from AllMusic

George Allen – trombone
Jerry Barnett – trombone
Terry Bingham – trumpet
Rashidi Bowe – bongos
Chuck Brown – vocals
John Jensen – trombone
Karl Kalbaugh – didjeridu
Tony Klatka – trumpet
Tom Lepson – Hammond organ, vocals
Alejandro Lucini – repinique, timbales
Meta4 – vocals
Shaun Murphy – vocals
Vaughn Nark – trumpet
Jack O'Dell – drums
Nick Smith – vocals
Nap Turner – vocals
Esther Williams – vocals
Chris Walker – trumpet
Marc Weigel – trumpet
Rob White – arranger, cajon, congas, drums, Iya, tres Golpe, wind chimes
Pierre M. Sprey – engineer, liner notes
Nelson Rodriguez – arranger, claves, quinto, vocals
Larry Willis – arranger, music direction

References

1997 albums
Chuck Brown albums
Jazz albums by American artists